The 1844 New Jersey Constitution is the second state constitution for the State of New Jersey and was replaced by the current state constitution adopted in 1947.  It was preceded by the 1776 New Jersey Constitution.

External links 
 The New Jersey State Constitution: A Reference Guide by Robert F. Williams

Legal history of New Jersey
Constitution
Constitution of New Jersey
Defunct state constitutions of the United States
1844 documents